Louis Corners is an unincorporated community located in the town of Schleswig, Manitowoc County, Wisconsin, United States. Wisconsin Highway 149 ran through the community before it was decommissioned.

Images

References

Unincorporated communities in Manitowoc County, Wisconsin
Unincorporated communities in Wisconsin